Country store may refer to:

 A general store in a rural setting such as a village
 Country Store, an American bluegrass band, had the only U.S. charting hit, "To Love You"
 Country Store (muesli), a muesli-based breakfast cereal